Jón Þór Ólafsson (born 13 March 1977) is an Icelandic politician.

A business administration student at the University of Iceland, he was elected to the Althing in the 2013 Icelandic parliamentary election. He is a member of the Pirate Party Iceland.

He represented the Reykjavik Constituency South until he resigned in 2015, and was replaced by Ásta Helgadóttir. In 2016 he was again elected to the Althing.

References

External links
Jón Þór Ólafsson biography at althingi.is

Living people
Jon Thor Olafsson
Jon Thor Olafsson
Jon Thor Olafsson
1977 births
Jon Thor Olafsson